Audioweb is the eponymously titled debut album from the Manchester-based band.  The album was released in the UK in October 1996, along with a 2CD limited edition version containing a bonus disc of 6 live tracks.

The album was produced by Kevin Bacon and Jonathan Quarmby with additional production and programming by Audioweb.

Track listing
All tracks written by Audioweb, except where noted.

Track 7 contains a sample of the Wayne Smith song, "Saying Goodbye".

All tracks on the live CD were performed at the Reading Festival on August 25, 1996, except "Faker", which was performed at BBC Radio One's Sound City music festival held in Leeds on April 11, 1996.

Personnel
Robin File - Guitar, Programming
Maxi - Drums
Martin Merchant - Vocals
Sean McCann - Bass, Programming
DJ Play  - Scratches
Jonathan Quarmby - Additional Programming

References

1996 albums
Audioweb albums
Albums produced by Kevin Bacon (producer)
Albums produced by Jonathan Quarmby